Kulczyk may refer to:

People
 Dominika Kulczyk (1977), Polish businesswoman and philanthropist
 Grażyna Kulczyk (1950), Polish investor, art collector and philanthropist
 Henry Kulczyk, American politician from Idaho
  (1925-2013), Polish entrepreneur, soldier, and social activist
 Jan Kulczyk (1950-2015), Polish billionaire businessman
 Sebastian Kulczyk (1980), Polish manager and entrepreneur

Other
 Kulczyk Foundation, a Polish philanthropic foundation
 Kulczyk Investments, an international investment company

Polish-language surnames
Kulczyk family